Robert Hahn could refer to:

Robert A. Hahn (born 1945), American medical anthropologist and epidemiologist 
Robert C. Hahn, American lawyer and politician from Massachusetts
Bob Hahn (1925–2009), American basketball player
Robert Hahn (poet), American poet